Mirabeau may refer to:

People
 Victor de Riqueti, marquis de Mirabeau (1715–1789), French physiocrat 
 Honoré Gabriel Riqueti, comte de Mirabeau (1749–1791), renowned orator, a figure in the French Revolution and son of Victor
 André Boniface Louis Riqueti de Mirabeau (1754–1792), also known as Barrel Mirabeau, brother of Honoré
 Mirabeau B. Lamar (1798–1859), second President of the Republic of Texas

Places
 8169 Mirabeau, a minor planet
 Mirabeau, Alpes-de-Haute-Provence, a commune of the Alpes-de-Haute-Provence, France
 Mirabeau, Vaucluse, a commune of Vaucluse, France
 Le Bignon-Mirabeau, a commune of Loiret, Centre-Val de Loire, France
 Les Pennes-Mirabeau, a commune of Bouches-du-Rhône, France

Other uses
 Le Mirabeau, a high-rise building in Monaco
 Mirabeau (company), a Dutch company 
 Mirabeau (Paris Métro), a station on Paris Métro, France
 Mirabeau restaurant, Dublin, operated 1972–1984 by Seán Kinsella
 Mirabeau, a sector on the north side of the Circuit de Monaco
 Mirabeau, a sports car by Leblanc
 French battleship Mirabeau (1910s)
 Mirabeau a 1790s French slaveship captured by Hope
 Jean-Pierre Mirabeau, a Mobile Fighter G Gundam character

See also

 Mirebeau, a commune in Vienne, Poitou-Charentes, France
 Pont Mirabeau, a bridge that crosses the Seine in Paris, France
 Cours Mirabeau, a street in Aix-en-Provence, France